Cristiano Alves Pereira (born 9 October 1980), better known as Cris, is a former footballer who played as a defender. Born and raised in Brazil, he was naturalized by Togo, whose national team he represented internationally.

Biography
Cris was born in Joinville, a city in Santa Catarina, in the Southern Region of Brazil.

Cris was given a trial by Italian Club Brescia FC in 2005, but failed to impress to earn him a contract.

He played for Hong Kong First Division League team South China as a loan player before after joining the team in the middle of the 2006–07 season.

International career
Cris and other Brazilian-born played for the Togo national team on June–July 2003 in a 2004 African Cup of Nations Qualifying matches against Cape Verde, Kenya and Mauritania. He also played for Togo against the Ghanaian club Asante Kotoko in a friendly match on June 29, 2003 in Stade de Kégué, Lomé.

Career statistics in Hong Kong
As of May 14, 2008

References

External links

 Player Information on SouthChinaFC.com 

1980 births
Living people
Sportspeople from Santa Catarina (state)
People from Joinville
Association football defenders
Togolese footballers
Togo international footballers
Brazilian footballers
Joinville Esporte Clube players
Grêmio Esportivo Juventus players
Associação Chapecoense de Futebol players
FC Rouen players
Hong Kong First Division League players
South China AA players
Goiânia Esporte Clube players
Brusque Futebol Clube players
Juventus Atlético Clube players
Brazilian expatriate footballers
Brazilian expatriate sportspeople in Italy
Expatriate footballers in Italy
Brazilian expatriate sportspeople in France
Expatriate footballers in France
Brazilian expatriate sportspeople in Hong Kong
Expatriate footballers in Hong Kong
Naturalized citizens of Togo
Hong Kong League XI representative players
21st-century Togolese people
Brazilian emigrants to Togo
Togolese people of Brazilian descent